Since Uruguay's first official international football match in 1902, there have been 32 occasions when a Uruguayan player has scored three or more goals (a hat-trick) in a game. The first hat-trick was scored by José Piendibene against Argentina in 1919. The record for most goals scored in an international match by a Uruguayan player is five, which has been achieved by Héctor Scarone against Bolivia in 1926.

With three hat-tricks, Pedro Petrone and Javier Ambrois shares the record for most international hat-tricks scored by a Uruguayan player. Petrone is also the only Uruguayan to score a hat-trick in Olympics. Pedro Cea (1930), Óscar Míguez (1950) and Carlos Borges (1954) are the only three Uruguayan players to score a hat-trick in a FIFA World Cup match. Last player to score a hat-trick for Uruguay is Abel Hernández, who found the net four times in a 2013 FIFA Confederations Cup match against Tahiti.

Uruguay have conceded 21 hat-tricks in their history, 10 of them in matches against Argentina. Last player to score a hat-trick against Uruguay is Brazilian midfielder Paulinho.

Note: Whenever scores and results are mentioned in this article, Uruguay's goal tally is given first.

Hat-tricks for Uruguay

Hat-tricks conceded by Uruguay

References

hat-tricks
Uruguay
Uruguay